KPLT (1490 AM) is a radio station broadcasting a Classic Country format. Licensed to Paris, Texas, United States, the station serves the Paris area. The station is currently owned by East Texas Broadcasting, Inc. and features programming from Fox News. KPLT-AM simulcasts with translator K242BC on 96.3 FM.

Programming
The Talk of Paris M-F at 8:00am to 10:00am. CDT
All other day-parts feature programming from Westwood One.

References

External links

PLT
News and talk radio stations in the United States